The Comunidade Intermunicipal do Tâmega e Sousa is an administrative division in northern Portugal. It was created in 2009. Since January 2015, Tâmega e Sousa is also a NUTS3 subregion of Norte Region, that covers the same area as the intermunicipal community. The seat of the intermunicipal community is Penafiel. Tâmega e Sousa comprises parts of the former districts of Aveiro, Braga, Porto and Viseu. The population in 2011 was 432,915, in an area of 1,831.52 km².

Municipalities

The intermunicipal community of Tâmega e Sousa consists of 11 municipalities:

References

External links
Official website CIM Tâmega e Sousa

Intermunicipal communities of Portugal
Norte Region, Portugal